Here's Hollywood is an American celebrity interview program which aired on weekday afternoons on NBC at 4:30 Eastern time from September 26, 1960, to December 28, 1962.

Overview
In the first season, the interviews were conducted by Dean Miller and Joanne Jordan. In the second season, Helen O'Connell replaced Jordan.

Among those interviewed were Rhonda Fleming and her third husband, Lang Jeffries, three months before their divorce, and another married couple, Steve Lawrence and Eydie Gormé. From The Three Stooges appeared Moe Howard, Larry Fine and Joe DeRita.

Others who appeared on the broadcast, some twice, included Fred Astaire, Carroll Baker, Bob Barker, Edgar Bergen, Polly Bergen, Neville Brand, Anita Bryant, Sebastian Cabot, John Cassavetes, Lon Chaney, Jr., Gary Crosby, Bob Cummings, Abby Dalton, Ann B. Davis, Bette Davis, William Demarest, Bob Denver, Bradford Dillman, Fabian, Constance Ford, Connie Francis, Annette Funicello, Judy Garland, George Gobel, Hermione Gingold, Lorne Greene, Cedric Hardwicke, Sessue Hayakawa, Paul Henreid, Darryl Hickman, Earl Holliman, Edward Everett Horton, Robert Horton, Tab Hunter, David Janssen, Rick Jason, Carolyn Jones, Danny Kaye, Buster Keaton, Gene Kelly, Jack Kelly and Don Knotts.

Lorne Greene, Pernell Roberts, Dan Blocker, Michael Landon, The Lennon Sisters, Peter Lorre, Carol Lynley, Barbara Luna, Shirley MacLaine, Nobu McCarthy, Steve McQueen, Lori Martin, Harpo Marx, Jayne Meadows, Robert Mitchum, Ricardo Montalbán, Elizabeth Montgomery, Terry Moore, Don Murray, Jan Murray, Bob Newhart, Kathleen Nolan, Jay North, Gregory Peck, Cynthia Pepper, Anthony Quinn, George Raft, Tony Randall, Rex Reason, Edward G. Robinson, Wayne Rogers, Robert Ryan, Mickey Rooney, Charles Ruggles, Jane Russell, Telly Savalas, Gia Scala, Maximilian Schell, Rod Serling, Fay Spain, Yoko Tani, Danny Thomas, Jack Warden, Jack Webb, Richard Widmark, Johnny Weissmuller, Cornel Wilde and Gig Young also appeared.

Production notes
The program was a Desilu Production. Jack Linkletter, son of Art Linkletter, conducted some of the interviews in 1962.

References

External links 
 

1960 American television series debuts
1962 American television series endings
Black-and-white American television shows
English-language television shows
NBC original programming
Television series by CBS Studios
American television talk shows
Television series by Desilu Productions